Cathepsin K, abbreviated CTSK, is an enzyme that in humans is encoded by the CTSK  gene.

Function 
The protein encoded by this gene is a cysteine cathepsin, a lysosomal cysteine protease involved in bone remodeling and resorption. This protein, which is a member of the peptidase C1 protein family, is expressed predominantly in osteoclasts.

Cathepsin K is a protease, which is defined by its high specificity for kinins, that is involved in bone resorption. The enzyme's ability to catabolize elastin, collagen, and gelatin allows it to break down bone and cartilage. This catabolic activity is also partially responsible for the loss of lung elasticity and recoil in emphysema. Cathepsin K inhibitors show great potential in the treatment of osteoporosis. Cathepsin K is degraded by Cathepsin S, in a process referred to as Controlled Cathepsin Cannibalism.

Cathepsin K expression is stimulated by inflammatory cytokines that are released after tissue injury.

Clinical significance 
Cathepsin K is expressed in a significant fraction of human breast cancers, where it could contribute to tumor invasiveness.  Mutations in this gene are the cause of pycnodysostosis, an autosomal recessive disease characterized by osteosclerosis and short stature. Cathepsin K has also been found to be over-expressed in glioblastoma.

That the expression of cathepsin K is characteristic for some cancers and not others has been documented. Cathepsin K antibodies are marketed for research into expression of this enzyme by various cells.

Merck had a cathepsin K inhibitor, odanacatib, in Phase III clinical trials for osteoporosis. In September, 2016, Merck announced they were discontinuing development of odanacatib after their own assessment of adverse events and an independent assessment showed increased risk of stroke.  Other cathepsin K inhibitors are in various stages of development.  Medivir has a cathepsin K inhibitor, MIV-711 (L-006235), in Phase IIa clinical trial, as a disease modifying osteoarthritis drug, as of October 2017.

References

Further reading

Additional images

External links
 The MEROPS online database for peptidases and their inhibitors: C01.036
 

EC 3.4.22
Proteases
Cathepsins